Don’t Worry Be Happy is a Marathi drama by Mihir Rajda, which was produced on stage in Mumbai, India, in 2016, starring Spruha Joshi and Umesh Kamat in lead roles. Don’t Worry Be Happy is produced by Nandu Kadam under the banner of Sonal Productions and directed by Adwait Dadarkar.

Don’t Worry Be Happy is a gen-next drama which tells the problems of E-generation and tries to find solutions to it.

Plot 
The story of Don’t Worry Be Happy revolves around Akshay (Umesh Kamat) and Pranoti (Spruha Joshi), a 21st-century typical Marathi couple immersed in their career with proper family planning and a no children policy for five years of marriage. The story unravels as Pranoti is diagnosed with PCOD.

The reason for PCOD is stated as ‘stress’, and the couple try to figure out what exactly is the reason behind this ‘stress’ in their life and how to avoid it with a tinge of humour. The story which unfolds is a tale which is common in many of the households today. Infertility, marriage woes, extended family issues – everything is showcased in a delicate manner in the play.

Cast 
 Umesh Kamat as Akshay
 Spruha Joshi as Pranoti
 Mihir Rajada as Chintan
 Swanandi Tikekar

Production

List of accolades received by Don’t Worry Be Happy 
Don’t Worry Be Happy  garnered many awards and nominations in several categories with praise for Spruha-Umesh's acting.

Accolades

Reception 
According to Stylewhack.com, "the drama nevertheless is heart warming, laughter stimulating and of course giving goosebumps during certain scenes. You can feel the audience’s pulse as they laugh, whistle, clap and sob with Akshay and Pranoti."

References

External links 
 

Indian plays
Marathi-language plays
2016 plays